Hills Golf Club is a golf club located in Mölndal near Gothenburg, Sweden. It hosted the Nordea Masters in August 2018, a European Tour event.

History
Situated ten kilometers south of central Gothenburg, the 18-hole course, designed by Arthur Hills, opened in 2004. At a cost of SEK 175 million it is one of the most ambitions golf projects in the Gothenburg Metropolitan Area, only rivaled by Vallda Golf & Country Club, opened in 2009.

A victim of the European debt crisis, in 2012 a consortium fronted by former European Tour player Johan Edfors from nearby Varberg bought the club. Edfors redesigned six of the holes and the new course was inaugurated in June 2014.

The Hills course is true to its name and laid out across a rugged landscape through woodland, marshland, forest ridges and rocky outcrops. It begins and ends in an enormous, natural amphitheater, with the 1st and 10th tees and the clubhouse all sitting on a huge rocky promontory overlooking the 9th and 18th holes, which are played on either side of a lake. 

Golfers Beatrice Wallin, Sofie Bringner, Hanna-Sofia Leijon, Carin Hjalmarsson, Joel Sjöholm, Niclas Fasth and Denmark's Thomas Bjørn have all been attached to the club in various capacities.

Tournaments hosted

Professional tournaments

Amateur tournaments
Swedish Junior Matchplay Championship – 2013

See also
List of golf courses in Sweden

References

External links

Golf clubs and courses in Sweden